Scott Spedding (born 4 May 1986 in  Krugersdorp, South Africa) is a retired French rugby union player. His position is fullback and he last played for Castres Olympique in the Top 14. He retired in 2019.

Spedding attended St. John's College, Johannesburg from 2000 to 2004 where he captained the first XV Rugby team. He was in the same boarding house and matriculated one year after four-time Tour de France champion Chris Froome.

In 2008, Spedding moved to France to play with Brive in the Top 14. After seven years of living in France, Spedding gained French citizenship in 2014.
In January 2015 he was named in the France 31-man squad for the 2015 Six Nations Championship by coach Philippe Saint-André. He debuted for France on 8 November 2014 against Fiji.

In May 2019, Spedding announced his retirement from rugby. He was also a guest pundit on Supersport during the 2019 Rugby World Cup in Japan.

References

External links

1986 births
Living people
French rugby union players
Rugby union centres
Sharks (Currie Cup) players
Sharks (rugby union) players
CA Brive players
Aviron Bayonnais players
People from Krugersdorp
Rugby union fullbacks
South African emigrants to France
France international rugby union players
Sportspeople from Gauteng